Kenzo Mori (Japanese: 森研三, 1914 – January 5, 2007) was a Nisei Japanese-Canadian journalist, writer, editor and publisher of the New Canadian, an English-language newspaper aimed at second- and third-generation Japanese Canadians.

Early life
Mori was born near Vancouver, British Columbia, in 1914.  He was the son of immigrants who returned to Japan in 1918.  He left Japan at age 16, graduating from high school in Canada. In due course, he earned an arts degree from the University of British Columbia.

Internment
Mori was interned in a camp north of Vancouver during the Second World War.  His older brother, George, was also in the camp.

Career
Mori became the  assistant Japanese editor of The New Canadian in the late 1940s. When retired in 1983, he had become the newspaper's editor. Mori was a founding member of the Ontario and Canadian Ethnic Press Associations.

In the pages of the newspaper and elsewhere, Mori tried to be a constructive voice in the movement to address  the material losses and humiliation Japanese-Canadians endured as "enemy aliens" during World War II.

Honours and awards
Mori was the recipient of a Queen Elizabeth II Golden Jubilee Medal for public service.

The Japanese government conferred the Order of the Rising Sun, Gold and Silver Rays, which represents the fifth highest of eight classes associated with the award.  This decoration recognized his efforts in promoting relations between Canada and Japan.

Selected works
Kenzo Mori and Hiroto Takami. (1977). Kanada no Manzo Monogatari: The First Immigrant to Canada. Nagasaki: Osuzuyama Shobo.
Original title in Japanese;

See also
Manzo Nagano
Kuchinotsu

Notes

1914 births
2007 deaths
Japanese-Canadian internees
University of British Columbia alumni
Recipients of the Order of the Rising Sun, 5th class